Cape Santiago is the southwestern point of the island of Luzon located within the municipality of Calatagan in Batangas, Philippines. It is a cape at the southern tip of Calatagan Peninsula which faces the South China Sea to the west and Pagapas Bay, an arm of Balayan Bay, to the east. The cape has been the site of a navigational aid since the 1890s.

It is administratively part of the barangay of Bagong Silang.

Geography

A conspicuous windmill stands about 0.4 mile east-southeast of the lighthouse.

Cape Santiago Lighthouse

The lighthouse at Cape Santiago is the oldest structure in Calatagan built in the 1890s during the Spanish colonial period. It is currently in a deteriorated condition with its original light source missing, replaced by an automatic light bulb donated by the Japan International Cooperation Agency that is no longer being used due to lack of funding.

References

Landforms of Batangas
Santiago